Ectatomma edentatum is a species of ant. Division of labor in this species is related to age, with younger ants caring for larvae and older ants foraging.

References

Ectatomminae
Insects described in 1863